WIHT (99.5 FM) is a Top 40 (CHR) formatted radio station that serves the greater Washington, D.C. metropolitan area. Located on the fifth floor of 1801 Rockville Pike in Rockville, Maryland, the station broadcasts 24 hours a day and is licensed to, and owned by, iHeartMedia. The transmitter is located on River Road in Bethesda, Maryland.

History

Early years (1960s–1999)
Long known as WGAY (named for its owner, Connie B. Gay, a well-known country music promoter) and located in Silver Spring, Maryland, the station ran a beautiful music format in the 1960s and 1970s, which evolved to an easy listening format by the 1980s (though it would initially air a country format for a year when it signed on in 1960). During that era, WGAY-FM typically simulcast its AM sister station, 1050 WQMR "Washington's Quality Music Radio," continuing the WQMR programming after the AM station signed off.  Eventually the FM came to be considered the primary signal, and WGAY would often finish at number one in the Persons 12+ Arbitron radio ratings for the Washington, D.C. area during the 1970s and 1980s.

Television ads for the station in the 1970s and 1980s featured station programmer Bob Chandler relaxing in a recliner while listening to his station's light mix of music playing in the background. During the 1980s, WGAY was reported to be then President Ronald Reagan's favorite radio station. WGAY was one of the last remaining major-market easy listening stations in the United States, as the format, which targeted older demographics, evolved towards a more mainstream adult contemporary format, or was dropped altogether.

At midnight on December 26, 1991, WGAY changed branding to "Easy 99.5", and shifted towards mainstream AC.

David Burd of WASH-FM and Beverly Fox of WARW became the new morning hosts in 1994, replacing Steve Schy.

On September 1, 1995, at 8 a.m., WGAY re-branded as "Star 99.5" with new call sign WEBR, and shifted towards Hot AC, but listeners didn't accept the more up-tempo music, and the station switched back to branding themselves under the WGAY calls, though with a soft rock format, on June 24, 1996.

Jam'n 99.5 (1999–2001)
WGAY switched from the still ratings successful format permanently by the late 1990s, although not because its listeners were too few, but because demographically, they were getting too old and therefore less desirable for radio advertisers. At 2:00 p.m. on April 13, 1999, "Evergreen" by Barbra Streisand was faded out with a liner touting a change, bringing the end to WGAY. After three days of simulcasting sister stations WTJM in New York City, KCMG in Los Angeles, and WUBT in Chicago, the station changed to an urban oldies format at 3:00 p.m. on April 16, known as WJMO-FM ("Jam'n 99.5"). At the time, they were co-owned with AM station WJMO in Cleveland, Ohio. The format lasted for almost two years. However, with ratings on the decline due to the arguable burnout factor of the music, combined with competition from WBIG-FM (which at the time played an oldies format; they now play a classic rock format), Clear Channel Communications (now iHeartMedia) (who acquired the station in 2000 due to a merger with AMFM Media and had dropped the format in other markets due to similar factors) decided to take the station in a different direction. Unlike other stations that dropped the format, however, WJMO gave its listeners the weekend to say goodbye.

Hot 99.5 (2001–present)

"Jam'n" signed off at 7:00 a.m. on April 2, 2001; the last song played on "Jam'n" was "Last Dance" by Donna Summer. That was followed by a "Survivor Radio 99.5" stunt before the current CHR format debuted as "Hot 99.5" at 5:00 p.m. on April 6. The first song on "Hot" was "Survivor" by Destiny's Child. With the change of format came a change in call sign to the current WIHT on April 18, 2001.

WIHT's full market signal helped competitor 104.1 WWZZ (Z104) evolve into a more modern AC direction in late 2001; WWZZ would be driven out of the format entirely in 2006 as a result of WTOP moving to WGMS' former 103.5 FM frequency. The station was also considered to be Baltimore's default Top 40 station since their previous Top 40 station, WXYV (102.7 FM, now WQSR), would flip in September 2001, and promos for Clear Channel's Baltimore stations would occasionally air on WIHT. (Baltimore finally got a Top 40 station in November 2009, when sister station WCHH flipped from modern rock to Top 40 as "Z 104-3.") The station's main competitors are Entercom's combination of urban-leaning Rhythmic Contemporary WPGC-FM 95.5 and for years  adult top 40 WIAD ("94.7 Fresh FM", now classic hits "94.7 The Drive"), and Cumulus Media's adult top 40 WRQX ("Mix 107.3", now K-Love station WLVW).

HD Programming
WIHT-FM's HD Radio HD2 format was flipped to iHeartMedia's successful Pride Radio format at Midnight on July 16, 2013, replacing the "Hot Spot"-branded "New! Music" format that had been running on the HD2 signal since 2007.

The Kane Show
Kane resigned from his programming position at WFLZ/Tampa on October 31, 2006, to start "The Kane Show" during the morning drive programming block on WIHT. He replaced the existing show The Hot Morning Mess with Mark Kaye, Kris Gamble and producer Ron Ross, who exited the station on November 1, 2006. The Kane Show officially hit the Washington, D.C.-area airwaves on November 13, 2006.

The show originally started off with Kane as the host and Sarah Fraser and Samy K as his co-hosts. After Samy left the show in August 2011 to work on his musical career with his band, Bonnie Rash, he was replaced by Intern John in 2012 (who got his stage name from the intern position he was holding at the time). During this time period, Melanie Glazener joined the show as a fourth co-host operating remotely out of Tampa, Florida. Sarah announced she was leaving the show in January 2013 to pursue a TV career in New York. She officially left the show later that Spring and was soon replaced by Danni Starr. After a period of absence, on January 20, 2014, Melanie announced on Instagram that she had left the show due to workplace differences. Soon after she was replaced by Rose. On February 11, 2016, Danni Starr left halfway during the show. After  weeks of being off air and many speculations on multiple media sites, Program Director Tommy Chuck confirmed that Danni had left the show.

The full lineup as it stands today is Intern John, Rose, and Riley (who joined in early 2017) as co-hosts.

The show was named "Best Local Morning show" in 2009 by industry magazine FMQB. The Kane Show was broadcast on seven additional radio stations, such as WNRW in Louisville, and WZFT in Baltimore. After 18 years, WFLZ's MJ Morning Show ended on February 17, 2012. It was announced that the Kane show would replace that show three days later.

The Kane Show debuted on iHeartRadio as a 24-hour on-demand channel in January 2010. Listeners were able to stream the Kane Show through both the iHeartRadio website and its respective smartphone applications.

On April 11, 2020, “The Kane Show” abruptly ended as Kane left the station after the previous day's show. On April 13, the show was rebranded as “Your Morning Show”, featuring remaining members Intern John, Riley Couture, Rose and Erick. Kane died less than a year after the show was cancelled.

See also

WKYS
WPGC-FM

References

External links

Live stream
Kane Show official website
WIHT-HD2
WIHT at Facebook
WIHT at Twitter
iHeartRadio- HOT995 Mobile

WIHT's top of the hour sounder in July 2003

IHT
Contemporary hit radio stations in the United States
IHeartMedia radio stations
Radio stations established in 1960
1960 establishments in Maryland